Clayton Valley is a valley in the U.S. state of Nevada.

The Silver Peak Range is located west of the valley.  The town of Silver Peak, Nevada is located in the valley.

Clayton Valley was named after Joshua E. Clayton, an early settler and mining engineer.

References

Valleys of Esmeralda County, Nevada